Gabon sent a delegation to compete at the 2008 Summer Paralympics in Beijing, People's Republic of China. It was Gabon's first participation in the Paralympic Games.

The country was represented solely by wheelchair athlete Thierry Mabicka, in track and field. Mabicka entered two events: the 800m race (T54 category), and the javelin (F57/58). In the former, he was disqualified, apparently "for attempting to race others with a non-racing wheelchair". In the latter, he finished last of fourteen, his throw of 11.72m earning him 302 points.

Results

See also
Gabon at the Paralympics
Gabon at the 2008 Summer Olympics

External links
International Paralympic Committee

References

Nations at the 2008 Summer Paralympics
2008
Summer Paralympics